Supportability may refer to:

Supportability (engineering)
Supportability (computer science)